Brigadier-General George Stuart Tuxford,  (7 February 1870 – 1942) was a pioneer of the Buffalo Pound Lake District, Saskatchewan, and later a senior officer in the Canadian Expeditionary Force (CEF). During the First World War he served first as officer commanding the 5th (Western Cavalry) Battalion and later as general officer commanding 3rd Canadian Infantry Brigade, 1st Canadian Division.

Early life
Born at Penmorfa, Carnarvonshire, North Wales, on 7 February 1870 to a Lincolnshire couple, Tuxford grew up in the English countryside before immigrating to Canada in the 1880s.

Major G.S. Tuxford was appointed as the first commanding officer of the independent D Squadron, a sub-unit of the 16th Mounted Rifles, the later being first militia unit to be raised in Saskatchewan since the North-West Rebellion. Later promoted to lieutenant colonel, Tuxford became the first commanding officer of the newly formed 27th Light Horse with its regimental headquarters located in Moose Jaw. The current D Squadron served as the foundation for this unit. Its establishment was approved by Minister of Militia, Brigadier General Sam Hughes, and Commanding Officer Militia District 10, Colonel Sam Steele.

First World War
At the outbreak of war, Lieutenant Colonel Tuxford attested for overseas service with the Canadian Expeditionary Force and was appointed to command the 5th (Western Cavalry) Battalion at  Camp Valcartier.  He took his unit overseas and led it during the Second Battle of Ypres in April 1915, as well at the Battle of Festubert.  In March 1916 he was promoted brigadier general and appointed to the command of the 3rd Canadian Infantry Brigade, which he led during the battles of Mount Sorrel, the Somme, Courcelette, Vimy Ridge, Hill 70, Amiens, Arras, and Cambrai. Following the armistice in November 1918, his formation participated in the march to the Rhine and served as part of the occupation force in Germany until all Canadian units were returned home.

References
 Saskatchewan Provincial Archives. Memoirs of Brigadier General George S. Tuxford CB CMG DSO ED. 4 Volumes.
 Andrew B. Godefroy, "Portrait of a Battalion Commander: Lieutenant Colonel George Stuart Tuxford at the Second Battle of Ypres, April 1915", in Colonel Bernd Horn ed. Intrepid Warriors: Perspectives on Canadian Military Leaders. (Kingston and Toronto: CDA Press and Dundurn Group, 2007), pp. 59–74.

1870 births
Canadian Militia officers
Canadian Expeditionary Force officers
Canadian generals of World War I
1942 deaths
Canadian Companions of the Distinguished Service Order
Canadian Companions of the Order of St Michael and St George
Canadian Companions of the Order of the Bath
English emigrants to Canada
14th Canadian Hussars officers
16th/22nd Saskatchewan Horse
Saskatoon Light Infantry
North Saskatchewan Regiment